Jack Thomas Keele (August 20, 1933 – November 5, 2019) was an American football coach. He served as the head football coach at California State University, Northridge from 1979 to 1985, compiling a record of 31–42–1. Keele graduated from Jefferson High School in Portland Oregon in 1951. He attended the University of Oregon, where he played football for the Oregon Webfoots as a tackle from 1957 to 1959. Keele began his coaching career in 1960 at North Eugene High School in Eugene, Oregon, working two years as an assistant football coach and sophomore basketball coach. He moved to Oregon City High School in Oregon City, Oregon in 1962, serving as head football coach and leading his team to a 9–1–1 record. The following year, he was hired as head football coach at the newly-formed Sheldon High School in Eugene.

Head coaching record

College

References

1933 births
2019 deaths
American football tackles
BC Lions coaches
Cal State Northridge Matadors football coaches
California Golden Bears football coaches
Hawaii Rainbow Warriors football coaches
Long Beach State 49ers football coaches
Oregon Ducks football players
Puget Sound Loggers football coaches
San Jose State Spartans football coaches
Washington State Cougars football coaches
Weber State Wildcats football coaches
High school basketball coaches in Oregon
High school football coaches in Oregon
Jefferson High School (Portland, Oregon) alumni
Sportspeople from Portland, Oregon
Players of American football from Portland, Oregon